The North Midlands Shield is an annual rugby union knock-out cup club competition organized by the North Midlands Rugby Football Union and was first contested during the 2001–02 season with Ledbury being the first ever winners, defeating Old Saltleians in the final held at Finstall Park in Bromsgrove.  It is currently open for clubs ranked in tier 7-8 of the English rugby union system that fall under the North Midlands RFU umbrella, including sides based in Birmingham and the West Midlands, Herefordshire, Shropshire and Worcestershire.  A tier 9 side, Shropshire based Oswestry, who play in Cheshire (South), also take part.  In 2014 the North Midlands RFU introduced a 'Plate' competition for sides eliminated in the early stages of the Shield.  It is one of three men's club competitions in the region along with the North Midlands Cup (for tier 5-6 sides) and the North Midlands Vase (for tier 9-10 sides).

The current format is as a knock-out cup with a preliminary round, first round, quarter-final, semi-final and final which is held at a neutral venue in May (2021-22’s Final was held at Worcester RFC) along with the cup and vase finals.  Due to the disjointed numbers of teams, teams that lose in either the preliminary or first round stage then contest the shield plate while winners go on to contest the shield.

North Midlands Shield winners

Number of wins

Shield
Kidderminster Carolians (3)
Bridgnorth (3)
Droitwich (2)
Solihull (2)
Bournville (1)
Camp Hill (1)
Ledbury (1)
Malvern (1)
Moseley Oak (1)
Old Halesonians (1)
Old Saltleians (1)
Old Yardleians (1)

Plate
Old Saltleians (2)
Droitwich (1)
Edwardians (1)
Old Yardleians (1)

Notes

See also
 North Midlands RFU
 North Midlands Cup
 North Midlands Vase
 English rugby union system
 Rugby union in England

References

External links
 North Midlands RFU

Recurring sporting events established in 2001
Rugby union cup competitions in England